Sisymbrium volgense is a species of flowering plant belonging to the family Brassicaceae.

Its native range is Southwestern European Russia to Caucasus.

Synonym:
 Sisymbrium wolgense M. Bieb. ex Fourn. (orthographical variant)

References

volgense